Pagri, sometimes also transliterated as  pagari, is the term for turban used in the Indian subcontinent. It specifically refers to a headdress that is worn by men and women, which needs to be manually tied. Other names include sapho.

Cloth
A pagri is usually a long plain unstitched cloth. The length may vary according to the type. The cloth indicates the region and the community of the wearer.

Specific styles

khirki-dār-pagari 
Methods of binding the pagri are innumerable, and khirki-dar-pagri is one particular style of dressing the turban. Khirki-dar-pagri means the turban with a window. Brocade piece may decorate the turban.

Paag

The paag is a headdress in the Mithila region of Bihar and in Mithila, Nepal.

Pheta

Pheta is the Marathi name for the traditional turban worn in Maharashtra, India. In ceremonies such as weddings, festive and cultural and religious celebrations as well it is common to wear Pheta. In many parts it is customary to offer male dignitaries a traditional welcome by offering a Pheta to wear. A traditional Pheta is usually long cloth typically 3.5 to 6 metres long and 1 metre wide. The choice of colour may indicate the occasion for which it is being worn and also may be typical to the place it is being worn in. Typical colours include Saffron (to indicate valour) and White (to indicate peace). In the past, wearing a Pheta was considered a mandatory part of clothing.

There are several styles of Pheta which are specific to regions, for example
 Kolhapuri and Puneri pheta
 Mawali pagadi (traditionally worn by Maratha warriors from the Mawal region of Maharashtra) 
 Mahatma Phule pagadi famously worn by the Maharashtrian reformer, the activist from whom it gets the name.

Peta

The peta is a turban worn in Mysore and Kodagu, it is the traditional indigenous attire worn by the erstwhile Kings of Mysore, called the Wodeyars (1399 to 1947), of the Kingdom of Mysore. Wodeyars wore a richly bejeweled turban made of silk and jari (gold threaded lace) to match with colourful dresses as part of the royal dress.

Administrators under the King, such as the Dewans' (Prime Minister appointed by the King) and other senior officials who swayed considerable power in matters of state administration also donned the Mysore peta.

After India became independent in 1947 and the princely state merged with the Indian union, the traditional Mysore peta has been retained as a symbol of heritage and cultural antecedents and distinguished people are honoured by the award of a Mysore peta with a shawl in formal functions.

Rajasthani pagari

Turbans worn in Rajasthan are referred to as the pagari. They vary in style, colour and size. They also indicate a wearer's social class, caste, region and the occasion it being worn for. Its shape and size may also vary with the climatic conditions of the different regions. Turbans in the hot desert areas are large and loose. Farmers and shepherds, who need constant protection from the elements of nature, wear some of the biggest turbans. The Rajasthani turban also has many practical functions. Exhausted travellers use it as a pillow, a blanket or a towel. It can be used to strain muddy water. An unravelled turban can also be used as a rope to draw water from a well with a bucket.

Prominent styles are pencha, sela and safa, although several local variants exist. A conventional pagari is usually 82 inches long and 8 inches wide. A Safa is shorter and broader. Ordinarily a turban of a single colour is worn. However, turbans of one of more colours may be worn by the elite or during special occasions such as festivals or weddings, etc. Rajasthani turbans are a prominent tourist attraction. Tourists are often encouraged to participate in turban-tying competitions.

Vedic Kshatriya Pagri 
Vedic Kshatriyas used a large turban consisting of two cloths, one to tie the turban and one to cover the turban completely. The second cloth used to cover the turban is saffron. This sheath contains kshātra-shaktī (Energy of a Kshatriya) and dnyān-shaktī. The turban acts like a crown on the head. A protective sheath is created around the head because of the turban. Therefore, the individual does not imbibe negative vibrations from the environment. The turban reduces the extent of distressing covering around individual’s intellect, and creates a bhāv of renunciation in the individual. This tradition died out when the pure Kshatriya society was slowly drawn away from its culture and went into standing armies.

Peshawari pagri

Peshawari pagri has been traditionally worn in Peshawar. It includes a cap called kulla and the cloth wrapped around it called lungi.

Association with figure of speech
A pagri is a symbol of honour and respect in all the regions where it is a practice to wear one. Its association with honour also lends its use in a figure of speech in associated languages. The figure of speech pagri uchaalna in Hindi (literal translation: to toss the turban) implies causing the loss of honour.

Recognition of communities

Different communities in Rajasthan are recognized by the colours and patterns on their pagris. The Kevat community wears only red Bandhani turban at all occasions. Jat community in Narwa village wears a bright yellow turban.

Pagri in Ancient India: from major museums

See also
 Gandhi cap
 Puneri Pagadi
 Rasam Pagri
 Sehra (headdress)
 Turban

References

Turbans
Pakistani headgear
Indian headgear
Bangladeshi clothing
Chinese clothing
Desi culture
Rajasthani clothing